Frank Pelleg (September 24, 1910 – December 20, 1968) was an Austro-Hungarian Empire-born Israeli composer.

References

1910 births
1968 deaths
Musicians from Prague
People from Haifa
Czechoslovak emigrants to Mandatory Palestine
Israeli people of Czech-Jewish descent
Israeli composers